Count Ferdinand de Berlo (1654—1725), lord of Brus and Chokier, was the eleventh bishop of Namur.

Life
Berlo was born in Namur, the son of Jean, Count of Berlo, and Anne-Marguerite-Ursule de Berlo d'Hozémont. After studying Philosophy at Leuven University, and Law in Ingolstadt and Rome, he became a canon of Liège Cathedral. In December 1697, Pope Innocent XII confirmed his appointment as bishop of Namur.

As bishop he had a compendium of the synodal decrees of the diocese published, Decreta et statuta omnium synodorum diocesanarum Namurcensium (Namur, C. G. Albert, 1720).

He died at Chokier Castle on 24 August 1725.

References

External links
 Mgr Ferdinand de Berlo de Brus, 11ème évêque de Namur de 1697 à 1725

1654 births
1725 deaths
Bishops of Namur